On 20 October 2017, suicide bombers attacked mosques in Kabul and Ghor Province, Afghanistan, killing at least 60 people.

During Friday prayers on 20 October 2017, a gunman entered Imam Zaman, a Shia mosque in Kabul. He opened fire, then detonated a bomb - killing about 40 people.

During Friday prayers on the same day, a suicide bomber detonated his explosives in a Sunni mosque in Ghor Province, killing at least 20 people.

Islamic State – Khorasan Province claimed responsibility for the Kabul attack.

In 2017, insurgents carried out many attacks in Afghanistan, including several in October. Major attacks included those which killed over 70 people in Gardez and Ghazni on 17 October and a double suicide bombing which killed 43 Afghan soldiers in Kandahar Province on 19 October.

See also
 List of terrorist attacks in Kabul

References

2017 in Kabul
20 October attacks
2010s crimes in Kabul
21st century in Ghor Province
20 October 2017 attacks
Attacks on buildings and structures in 2017
20 October 20217 attacks
Crime in Ghor Province
20 October 2017 attacks
Islamic terrorist incidents in 2017
Mass murder in 2017
Mass murder in Kabul
Mosque bombings by Islamists
Mosque bombings in Asia
October 2017 crimes in Asia
Suicide bombings in Kabul
20 October attacks